The Archdiocese of Morelia is a Latin Church ecclesiastical territory or archdiocese of the Catholic Church in western central Mexico. It was erected on 11 August 1536 as the Diocese of Michoacán.

The cathedra is found in the Cathedral of the Transfiguration in the episcopal see of Morelia, capital of Michoacán state. It also has a minor basilica: Basílica de Nuestra Señora de la Salud, in Pátzcuaro, Michoacán de Ocampo.

History 
 It was established on 11 August 1536 as Diocese of Michoacán, on territory split off from the then Diocese of México.
 It lost territory repeatedly: on 13 July 1548 to establish the then Diocese of Guadalajara, on 15 Dec 1777 to establish the Diocese of Linares and on 31 Aug 1854 to establish the Diocese of San Luis Potosí.
 It was raised to the rank of Metropolitan Archdiocese of Michoacán by Pope Pius IX on 26 January 1863, having lost territory to establish the Diocese of León and the Diocese of Querétaro.
 It lost territory again on 16 Mar 1863 to establish the Diocese of Chilapa and on 26 Jul 1913 to establish the Diocese of Tacámbaro
 It was renamed to the Archdiocese of Morelia after its see on 22 November 1924.
 It lost territory again on 13 Oct 1973 to establish the Diocese of Celaya and on 2004 to establish the Diocese of Irapuato
 In January 2015, Pope Francis created Morelia's archbishop, Alberto Suárez Inda, the archdiocese's first Cardinal. According to an Associated Press story, Suárez Inda "has helped mediate political conflicts and kidnappings in one of Mexico's most violence-plagued states."

Bishops

Episcopal ordinaries
 Bishops of Michoacán
 Vasco de Quiroga (1536.08.18 – death 1565.03.14)
 Antonio Ruíz de Morales y Molina (1566.05.15 – 1572.12.10), later Bishop of Puebla de los Angeles (Mexico) (1572.12.10 – death 1576.07.17)
 Juan de Medina Rincón y de la Vega, Order of St. Augustine (O.S.A.) (1574.06.18 – death 1588.06.30)
 Alfonso Guerra, Dominican Order (O.P.) (1592.03.17 – death 1596.06.18), previously Bishop of Paraguay (Paraguay) (1579.02.06 – 1592.03.17)
 Domingo de Ulloa, O.P. (1598.04.03 – death 1601), previously Bishop of Roman Catholic Diocese of León in Nicaragua (Nicaragua) (1585.02.04 – 1591.12.09), Bishop of Popayán (Colombia) (1591.12.09 – 1598.04.03)
 Andrés de Ubilla, O.P. (1603.01.29 – death 1603.05), previously Bishop of Chiapas (Mexico) (1592.05.21 – 1603.01.29)
 Juan Fernández de Rosillo (1603.06.16 – death 1606.10.29), previously Bishop of Vera Paz (Guatemala) (1592.06.12 – 1603.06.16)
 Baltazar de Cobarrubias y Múñoz, O.S.A. (1608.02.04 – death 1622.07.22), previously Bishop of Paraguay (Paraguay) (1601 – 1603.01.13), Bishop of Nueva Caceres (Philippines) (1603.01.13 – 1605.06.06), Bishop of Antequera (Mexico) (1605.06.06 – 1608.02.04)
 Alonso Orozco Enriquez de Armendáriz Castellanos y Toledo, Mercedarians (O. de M.) (1624.04.15 – death 1628.12.05), previously Titular Bishop of Sidon (1605.06.27 – 1610.08.30) & Auxiliary Bishop of Burgos (Spain) (1605.06.27 – 1610.08.30), then Bishop of Santiago (Cuba) (1610.08.30 – 1624.04.15)
 Francisco de Rivera y Pareja, O. de M. (1629.09.17 – death 1637.09.05), previously Bishop of Guadalajara (Mexico) (1618.01.29 – 1629.09.17)
 Marcos Ramírez de Prado y Ovando, Friars Minor (O.F.M.) (1639.05.30 – 1666.12.15), previously Bishop of Chiapas (Mexico) (1633.01.31 – 1639.05.30); later Metropolitan Archbishop of México (Mexico) (1666.12.15 – death 1667.05.14)
 Payo Enríquez de Rivera Manrique, O.S.A. (1668.01.16 – 1668.09.17), previously Bishop of Guatemala (Guatemala) (1657 – 1668.01.16); later Metropolitan Archbishop of México (Mexico) (1668.09.17 – retired 1681.06.30)
 Francisco Antonio Sarmiento de Luna y Enríquez, O.S.A. (1668.12.12 – 1673.09.25), later Bishop of Almería (Spain) (1673.09.25 – 1675.05.27), Bishop of Coria (Spain) (1675.05.27 – 1683.07.21)
 Francisco Verdín y Molina (1673.11.27 – death 1675.04.29), previously Bishop of Guadalajara (Mexico) (1665.07.06 – 1673.11.27)
 Francisco de Aguiar y Seijas y Ulloa (1677.08.30 – 1680), later Metropolitan Archbishop of México (Mexico) (1680 – death 1698.08.14)
 Antonio de Monroy, O.P. (1680 – 1680), previously Master (superior general) of the Order of Preachers (Dominicans) (1677 – 1686); later Metropolitan Archbishop of Santiago de Compostela (Spain) (1685.07.10 – death 7 Nov 1715)
 Juan de Ortega Cano Montañez y Patiño (1682.06.08 – 21 Jun 1700), previously Bishop of Durango (Mexico) (1674.04.16 – 1675.09.09), Bishop of Guatemala (Guatemala) (1675.09.09 – 1682.06.08); later Metropolitan Archbishop of México (Mexico) (21 Jun 1700  – 16 Dec 1708)
 García Felipe de Legazpi y Velasco Altamirano y Albornoz (5 Mar 1700  – 14 Jan 1704), previously Bishop of Durango (Mexico) (1691.08.23 – 5 Mar 1700); later Bishop of Puebla de los Angeles (Mexico) (14 Jan 1704 – death 1705.12)
 Manuel de Escalante Colombres y Mendoza (31 May 1704 – death 15 May 1708), previously Bishop of Durango (Mexico) (1699 – 31 May 1704)
 Felipe Ignacio Trujillo y Guerrero (22 May 1713 – death 6 Feb 1721)
 Francisco de la Cuesta, Brothers Hospitallers of St. John of God (O.S.H.) (23 Sep 1723 – death 30 May 1724), previously Metropolitan Archbishop of Manila (Philippines) (28 Apr 1704  – 23 Sep 1723); Archbishop (personal title)
 Juan José de Escalona y Calatayud (15 Nov 1728 – death 23 May 1737), previously Bishop of Caracas (Venezuela) (15 Mar 1717  – 15 Nov 1728)
 José Félix Valverde (24 Nov 1738 – death 23 Feb 1741), Bishop of Caracas (Venezuela) (15 Nov 1728  – 24 Nov 1738)
 Francisco Pablo Matos Coronado (2 Jan 1741 – death 26 Apr 1744), previously Bishop of Yucatán (Mexico) (9 Jul 1734  – 2 Jan 1741)
 Martín de Elizacoechea (8 Mar 1745 – death 19 Nov 1756), previously Bishop of Durango (Mexico) (27 Jul 1735  – 8 Mar 1745)
 Pedro Anselmo Sánchez de Tagle (26 Sep 1757 – death 27 May 1772), previously Bishop of Durango (Mexico) (10 Apr 1747  – 26 Sep 1757)
 Luis Fernando de Hoyos y Mier (12 Jul 1773 – death 7 May 1776)
 Juan Ignacio de la Rocha (3 Feb 1782 – death 3 Feb 1782)
 Francisco Antonio de San Miguel Iglesias y Cajiga, O.S.H. (15 Dec 1783 – death 18 Jun 1804), previously Bishop of Comayagua (Honduras) (17 Feb 1777  – 15 Dec 1783)
 Marcos de Moriana y Zafrilla (26 Jun 1805 – death 27 Jul 1809)
 Father Manuel Abad y Queipo (1811 – 1811, not consecrated bishop)
 Juan Cayetano José María Gómez de Portugal y Solis (28 Feb 1831 – death 4 Apr 1850), previously Titular Bishop of Claudiopolis in Isauria (19 Oct 1830  – 28 Feb 1831)
 Clemente de Jesús Munguía y Núñez (3 Oct 1850  – 26 Jan 1863 see below)

 Metropolitan Archbishops of Michoacán
 Clemente de Jesús Munguía y Núñez (see above'' 26 Jan 1863 – death 14 Dec 1868)
 José Ignacio Árciga Ruiz de Chávez (21 Dec 1868 – death 7 Jan 1900), succeeding as former auxiliary bishop of Michoacán (4 Mar 1866  – 21 Dec 1868) & Titular Bishop of Lagania (4 Mar 1866  – 21 Dec 1868)
 Atenógenes Silva y Álvarez Tostado (21 Aug 1900 – death 26 Feb 1911), previously Bishop of Colima (Mexico) (11 Jul 1892  – 21 Aug 1900)
 Leopoldo Ruiz y Flóres (27 Nov 1911  – 22 Nov 1924), previously Bishop of León in Mexico (Mexico) (12 Nov 1900  – 14 Sep 1907), Metropolitan Archbishop of Linares (Mexico) (14 Sep 1907  – 27 Nov 1911)

 Archbishops of Morelia
 Leopoldo Ruiz y Flóres (22 Nov 1924  – 12 Dec 1941), also Apostolic Delegate (papal diplomatic envoy) to Mexico (1929 – 1937)
 Luis María Altamirano y Bulnes (12 Dec 1941 – death 7 Feb 1970), previously Bishop of Huajuapan de León (Mexico) (3 Aug 1923  – 13 Mar 1933), Bishop of Tulancingo (Mexico) (13 Mar 1933  – 1 May 1937), Titular Archbishop of Bizya (1 May 1937  – 12 Dec 1941)& Coadjutor Archbishop of Morelia (1 May 1937  – 12 Dec 1941), succeeding as such
 Manuel Martín del Campo y Padilla (7 Feb 1970 – death 6 Apr 1972), previously Titular Bishop of Aulon (3 Aug 1946  – 26 Dec 1948), Coadjutor Bishop of León (3 Aug 1946  – 26 Dec 1948), succeeding as Bishop of León in Mexico (Mexico) (26 Dec 1948  – 10 Jun 1965), Titular Archbishop of Vadesi (10 Jun 1965  – 7 Feb 1970) & Coadjutor Archbishop of Morelia (10 Jun 1965  – 7 Feb 1970) succeeded as such
 Estanislao Alcaraz y Figueroa (3 Jul 1972 – retired 20 Jan 1995), previously Bishop of Matamoros (Mexico) (20 Jan 1959  – 3 Mar 1968), Bishop of San Luis Potosí (Mexico) (3 Mar 1968  – 3 Jul 1972)
 Alberto Suárez Inda (20 Jan 1995 – retired 5 Nov 2016), previously Bishop of Tacámbaro (Mexico) (5 Nov 1985  – 20 Jan 1995); created Cardinal-Priest of S. Policarpo (14 Feb 2015 [11 Oct 2015] – ...)
 Carlos Garfias Merlos (5 Nov 2016 – ...), previously Archbishop of Acapulco

Coadjutor bishops
Luis María Martínez y Rodríguez (1933–1937); did not succeed to see; appointed Archbishop of México, Federal District
Luis María Altamirano y Bulnes (1937–1941)
Manuel Martín del Campo Padilla (1965–1970)

Auxiliary bishops
Benito María de Moxó y Francolí O.S.B. (1803–1805), appointed Archbishop of La Plata o Charcas, Bolivia
José Antonio de la Peña y Navarro (1862–1863), appointed Bishop of Zamora, Michoacán
José Ignacio Árciga Ruiz de Chávez (1866–1868), appointed Archbishop here
Luis María Martínez y Rodríguez (1923–1934), appointed Coadjutor here
Salvador Martinez Silva (1951–1969)
José de Jesús Tirado Pedraza (1963–1965), appointed Bishop of Ciudad Victoria, Tamaulipas
Román Acevedo Rojas (1967–1983)
Leopoldo González González (1999–2005), appointed Bishop of Tapachula, Chiapas
Francisco Moreno Barrón (2002–2008), appointed Bishop of Tlaxcala
Octavio Villegas Aguilar (2005–2015)
Carlos Suárez Cázares (2008–
Juan Espinoza Jiménez (2010–
Herculano Medina Garfias (2015–
Víctor Alejandro Aguilar Ledesma (2016–

Other priests of this diocese who became bishops
Luis María Altamirano y Bulnes, appointed Bishop of Apatzingán, Michoacán in 1962
Juan Jesús Cardinal Posadas Ocampo, appointed Bishop of Tijuana, Baja California Norte in 1970; future Cardinal
Alejo Zavala Castro, appointed Bishop of Tlapa, Guerrero in 1992
Rodrigo Aguilar Martínez, appointed Bishop of Matehuala, San Luís Potosí in 1997
Enrique Díaz Díaz, appointed Auxiliary Bishop of San Cristóbal de Las Casas, Chiapas in 2003

Province 
Its ecclesiastical province comprises the Metropolitan's own archdiocese and the following suffragan bishoprics:
 Roman Catholic Diocese of Apatzingan
 Roman Catholic Diocese of Ciudad Lázaro Cárdenas
 Roman Catholic Diocese of Tacámbaro
 Roman Catholic Diocese of Zamora in Mexico.

See also 
 List of Roman Catholic dioceses in Mexico

References

External links 
  
 

 
1530s establishments in Mexico
1536 establishments in New Spain
Morelia
Religious organizations established in 1536
Roman Catholic dioceses established in the 16th century
Roman Catholic dioceses in Mexico
Roman Catholic ecclesiastical provinces in Mexico